Håkan Sandberg (born 27 June 1958) is a Swedish former international football player, who played as a striker.

Club career
Sandberg started off his footballing career with Ludvika FF, before signing with the Allsvenskan club Örebro SK in 1976. He signed with IFK Göteborg in 1981, and helped the team with the 1981–82 UEFA Cup as well as the 1982, 1983, and 1984 Swedish Championships. In 1984, he left for Greece where he spent three seasons with 

On 5 July 1984, Sandberg joined AEK Athens and immediately stood out, not only for his distinctive appearance, but also for his playing style. Alongside Thomas Mavros and Márton Esterházy, created an amazing offensive triplet in the team. An unforgettable highlight of his career was Mavros' goal against Apollon Athens in December 1984, when alongside Sandberg he played a "volleyball" with headers in the opponent's area before scoring. During his spell at AEK he scored two hat-tricks against Panachaiki at home and Ethnikos Piraeus away from home. He also scored a brace in the away defeat against Panathinaikos with 3–2. He was the scorer for his club in the 1–1 at home against Olympiacos.

In the summer of 1987, he left AEK and signs with Olympiacos, but essentially his participation and contribution to the "red and whites" was almost zero, since he was suffering from injuries. He returned to Sweden in 1988 to finish up his career with GIF Sundsvall.

International career
Sandberg won a total of 20 youth caps for the Sweden U19 and U21 teams, scoring 4 goals. He made his full international debut for Sweden on 13 November 1982 in a UEFA Euro 1984 qualifier against Cyprus which Sweden won 1–0. He scored his first international goal for Sweden on 29 May 1983 in a UEFA 1984 qualifier against Italy which Sweden Sweden won 2–0. His last international appearance came on 17 November 1985 in a 1986 FIFA World Cup qualifier against Malta. Sandberg won a total of 13 caps for Sweden and scored three goals, but never appeared in a major international tournament.

Career statistics

Scores and results list Sweden's goal tally first, score column indicates score after each Sandberg goal.

Honours 

IFK Göteborg

UEFA Cup: 1981–82
Allsvenskan: 1982, 1983, 1984

References

External links

 Håkan Sandberg Interview

1958 births
Swedish footballers
Sweden international footballers
Swedish expatriate footballers
Allsvenskan players
Super League Greece players
Örebro SK players
IFK Göteborg players
AEK Athens F.C. players
Olympiacos F.C. players
GIF Sundsvall players
UEFA Cup winning players
Expatriate footballers in Greece
Swedish expatriate sportspeople in Greece
Association football forwards
People from Ludvika Municipality
Living people
Sportspeople from Dalarna County